Safar Shakeyev was a Kazakh filmmaker, director, screenwriter, producer and actor. He was born on September 2 1991 in the city of Kokshetau of Kokshetau region. His father is composer and singer Yerkesh Shakeyev.

Shakeyev was the winner of the third Kazakhstan competition on social advertising films. He was also winner of the NFFTY 2011 in the category Best experimental film, with the film Facing you.

Achievements and creativity 
Safar was a finalist and winner of many international film festivals, including:
«LA Shorts Fest» (Los Angeles, CA, USA) Finalist - Best Short Film ( «Thank You for Flying») [9] [10]
«National Film Festival for Talented Youth» (Seattle, WA, USA) - Finalist Best Short Film ( «Lotus»)
«Astana International Film Festival» (Astana, Kazakhstan) - a finalist in the category Art Fest ( «Offset») «
«National Film Festival for Talented Youth» (Seattle, WA, USA) - finalist of the best alternative cinema ( «One»)
«Bay Area High School Film Festival» (San Francisco, CA, USA) - winner of the best short film ( «Minus One») [11]
«Future of Cinema International Film Festival» (Interlochen, MI, USA) - Finalist - Best Short Film ( «Minus One»)

Safar also has created clip "Sport", with the participation of famous Kazakhstani athletes (Aset, Nurmakhan)

Education 
 2007-2010 The Athenian School, Danville, CA, USA.
 2010-2014 Chapman University, Orange, CA, USA. Faculty of Film Directing (Film Production / Directing).

Additional Education 

 2008 New York Film Academy, Hollywood, CA, USA. Acting.
 2009 New York Film Academy, Hollywood, CA, USA. Filmmaking.

Career 
 2012 - The music video "Radioveter" director / editor / actor
 2011 - The music video "Sport" Director / Editor
 2011 - The music video "Love Me" Director / Editor
 2014 - Caliber Media Company, Los Angeles, CA Entry
 2014 - Thank you for flying, Los Angeles, CA, producer / director / writer / editor
 2016 - Safar was the author and producer of Yrkesh Shakeyev's new album for piano and cello, which was recorded on 10–11 September in London at the legendary Abbey Road Studios. The recording was attended by well-known British musicians: pianist John Lenehan and cellist Alexander Baillie. Sound producer of the project was the famous British specialist Chris Krakker.

Awards 
 2009 - «Future of Cinema International Film Festival» (Interlochen, MI, USA) - Finalist - Best Short Film ( «Minus One»)
 2010 - «Bay Area High School Film Festival» (San Francisco, CA, USA) - winner of the best short film ( «Minus One»)
 2011 - «National Film Festival for Talented Youth» (Seattle, WA, USA) - winner of Best Alternative Cinema ( «Facing You»)
 2012 - «National Film Festival for Talented Youth» (Seattle, WA, USA) - finalist of the best alternative cinema ( «One»)
 2012 - «Astana International Film Festival» (Astana, Kazakhstan) - a finalist in the category Art Fest ( «Offset»)
 2013 - «National Film Festival for Talented Youth» (Seattle, WA, USA) - Finalist Best Short Film ( «Lotus»)
 2014 - «LA Shorts Fest» (Los Angeles, CA, USA) Finalist - Best Short Film ( «Thank You for Flying»)
 2015 - The winner of the third Kazakhstan competition on social advertising films, winner film is called  «Lyubim prirodu- lyubim Kazakhstan»

References

External links 
 
 Документальный фильм о жизни Сафара «Встретимся на небесах»

1991 births
2016 deaths
Kazakhstani film directors